Rachel Ticotin Strauss is an American film and television actress. She has appeared in films such as Fort Apache, The Bronx, Total Recall, Falling Down, and Con Air. She has appeared in the NBC legal drama Law & Order: LA as Lt. Arleen Gonzales, and guest starred in the "Warriors" episode of Blue Bloods in 2013 (season 3, episode 15), appearing as "Carmen Castillo".

Early life
Ticotin (pronounced "tick-oh-tin") was born in the Bronx, New York City, the daughter of Iris Torres, a Puerto Rican educator, and Abe Ticotin, a Russian-Jewish used-car salesman. She also has three brothers, Marcus, Daniel, and David A. Ticotin, a first assistant director who lives in Calabasas, California, with his wife Alexis and their children. Her brother Daniel, now known as Sahaj, is a musician and lead singer for the rock group Ra. Ticotin grew up and received her primary and secondary education in the Bronx.  Her parents enrolled her in the Ballet Hispanico of New York, where she took ballet lessons.

Career
In 1978, Ticotin made her film debut as a dancer in the film King of the Gypsies.  She also acted in the off-Broadway production of Miguel Piñero's The Sun Always Shines for the Cool.  During this period, she received an onscreen credit as a production assistant on Brian De Palma's Dressed to Kill.  Her first big break came when, working as a production assistant alongside her brother David in 1981, she was given a significant role as Isabella, Paul Newman's love interest in the movie Fort Apache, The Bronx.  That same year, she was listed as one of 12 promising new actors in John Willis' Screen World Vol. 33.

In 1983, she landed a regular role on NBC's television drama Love and Honor. Other television series in which she has appeared include: Ohara (1987), Women on the Inside (1991), Crime & Punishment (1993), and Disney's Gargoyles (1994).

Ticotin's film work includes: Critical Condition (1987) as Rachel Atwood, Total Recall (1990) as Melina alongside Arnold Schwarzenegger and Sharon Stone, Where the Day Takes You (1992) as Officer Landers, Falling Down (1993) as Detective Sandra Torres, First Time Felon (1997) as Mcbride alongside Omar Epps, and Con Air (1997) alongside Nicolas Cage, in which she earned an ALMA Award for her role as prison guard Sally Bishop. In 1995, she played the role of Doña Inez, the Mexican mother of Don Juan in the tongue-in-cheek romantic comedy Don Juan DeMarco, with Johnny Depp playing the title role.

Ticotin has participated in over 40 films and television series, appearing in Man on Fire (2004) as Mariana and The Sisterhood of the Traveling Pants (2005). Ticotin was cast as Vangie Gonzalez Taylor in the second season of PBS's television series American Family alongside Edward James Olmos, Esai Morales, Raquel Welch, and Kate del Castillo. Ticotin also appeared on television in season two of the ABC series Lost as Captain Teresa Cortez, mother of Michelle Rodriguez's character Ana Lucia Cortez.

In September 2010, she joined the cast of the NBC legal drama Law & Order: LA as Lt. Arleen Gonzales in place of Wanda De Jesus, who originally played the role. Ticotin reshot the scenes originally performed by De Jesus.

Personal life 
She was married to actor David Caruso from 1984 to 1987, with whom she has a daughter (Greta), born in 1984. Since 1998, she has been married to actor Peter Strauss.

Filmography

Awards and nominations
ALMA Awards
1998: Nominated, “Outstanding Actress in a Made-for-Television Movie or Mini-Series” – First Time Felon
1998: Nominated, “Outstanding Actress in a Feature Film” – Con Air

Saturn Award
1991: Nominated, “Best Supporting Actress” – Total Recall

Blockbuster Entertainment Award
1998: Nominated, “Favorite Supporting Actress in an Action/Adventure Film” – Con Air

See also

List of Puerto Ricans

References

External links

Profile of Rachel Ticotin among the cast of American Family at PBS.org

Living people
Actresses from New York City
People from the Bronx
American people of Russian-Jewish descent
American film actresses
American stage actresses
American television actresses
Jewish American actresses
Hispanic and Latino American actresses
American actresses of Puerto Rican descent
21st-century American Jews
21st-century American women
Year of birth missing (living people)